The eighth season of Married at First Sight premiered on 22 February 2021 on the Nine Network. Relationship experts John Aiken and Mel Schilling returned from the previous season, and were joined by sexologist Alessandra Rampolla to match 9 brides and 9 grooms together. Halfway through the experiment, the experts matched another 3 brides and 3 grooms together.

Couple profiles

Commitment ceremony history

  This couple left the experiment outside of commitment ceremony.
  This couple elected to leave the experiment during the commitment ceremony.

Controversy
The season was heavily criticised by media outlets and fans of the show due to the lack of diversity in casting. The series also saw accusations of misogyny against a number of the male participants. In June the Australian Communications and Media Authority revealed they were looking into the season after receiving 54 complaints from viewers about the show. Several of the complaints alleged the series had aired abusive interactions between participants through "gaslighting, social, verbal and mental abuse". The Network was later cleared of any breaches.

Ratings

References

8
2021 Australian television seasons
Television shows filmed in Australia